Anarchias longicaudis is a moray eel found in the eastern-central Atlantic Ocean. It was first named by Peters in 1877.

References

longicaudis
Fish of the Atlantic Ocean
Fish described in 1877
Taxa named by Wilhelm Peters